Ex-Flame is a 1930 American pre-Code drama film directed by Victor Halperin and starring Neil Hamilton, Marian Nixon, and Norman Kerry. The film is an adaptation of the 1861 Victorian novel East Lynne, but is set in contemporary England. This was the first production of the Poverty Row company Liberty Pictures. The following year, a more celebrated film version of the novel was released by Fox Film. Some sources state this is a lost film.

Cast
 Neil Hamilton as Sir Carlisle Austin  
 Marian Nixon as  Lady Catherine  
 Judith Barrie as  Barbara Lacey  
 Norman Kerry as  Beaumont Winthrop  
 'Snub' Pollard as  Boggins  
 Roland Drew as  Umberto  
 José Bohr as  Argentinean  
 Joan Standing as Kilmer  
 Cornelius Keefe as  Keith  
 May Beatty as  Lady Harriett  
 Lorimer Johnston as  Colonel Lacey  
 Joseph North as  Wilkins  
 Charles Crockett as  Parson  
 Billy Haggerty as  Master Stuart Austin  
 Louis Armstrong as   Louis Armstrong

References

Bibliography
 Pitts, Michael R. Poverty Row Studios, 1929–1940: An Illustrated History of 55 Independent Film Companies, with a Filmography for Each. McFarland & Company, 2005.

External links
 

1930 films
1930 drama films
1930s English-language films
American drama films
Films directed by Victor Halperin
Films set in England
Films based on British novels
American black-and-white films
1930s American films